Alexia may refer to:
 Alexia (given name)
 Alexia (Italian singer) (born 1967)
 Alexia (album), a 2002 album by the Italian singer
 Alexia Putellas (born 1994), Spanish footballer sometimes known mononymously
 Alexia: Labor Omnia Vincit, a 2022 docu-series about the footballer
 Alexia (condition) (also known as acquired dyslexia), loss of the ability to read due to cerebral disorder
 Pure alexia, a form in which other language skills are unaffected
 Alexia Wight, an Australian plant genus, synonym of Alyxia
 Index–Alexia Alluminio, an Italian cycling team
 MV Alexia, an oil tanker converted into a merchant aircraft carrier

See also 
 Alexias (fl. 4th century BC), Greek physician
 Alexa (disambiguation)
 Alexius, a given name